Winona State University (WSU) is a public university in Winona, Minnesota. It was founded as First State Normal School of Minnesota in 1858 and is the oldest member of the Minnesota State Colleges and Universities System. It was the first normal school west of the Mississippi River.

WSU offers more than 80 programs on its main campus as well as collegiate programs on satellite campuses at Winona State University-Rochester and the Winona West Campus. Its average annual enrollment is approximately 9,000 undergraduate and graduate students. Its sports teams compete as the Winona State Warriors in the NCAA Division II athletics in 14 sports, primarily in the Northern Sun Intercollegiate Conference.

History

Winona State University was founded as the First State Normal School, an institution specifically for educating and producing new elementary school teachers. In the 1850s, Minnesota was on the American frontier and lacked trained teachers. Winona settler John Ford lobbied the Minnesota Legislature to establish normal schools and rallied more than $5,000 in local donations to establish the state's first such institution. It was also the first tax-funded school west of the Mississippi River.

Classes at Winona Normal School began in September 1860, but the next year most of the male students as well as the principal and other staff left to serve in the American Civil War. The school closed in March 1862 due to the war, then for another two years due to the Sioux War of 1862. Its first class graduated in 1866. The program soon added a laboratory school in which local children received education from faculty while students observed or, occasionally, led lessons themselves. The normal school quickly outgrew its original four-room building, but state funding and local donations of money and land led to the construction of a proper facility in 1869.

The campus expanded with two new wings on "Old Main" in 1894, a library/gymnasium/kindergarten building—Ogden Hall—in 1909, and a women's dormitory—Morey Hall—in 1910. In 1915 a new building was constructed to house the laboratory school, and a second women's dormitory—Shepard Hall—appeared in 1920.

Winona State Normal School became Winona Teachers College in 1921 and was authorized to grant a four-year Bachelor of Education degree. In December 1922 a fire broke out in Old Main and completely destroyed it. No one was harmed, as it was during a term break. Local public buildings and churches offered space for classes and administrative business until a new main building, College Hall, was constructed in 1924.

The 1915 Model School Building, now Phelps Hall, and the 1924 College Hall, now Somsen Hall, were listed on the National Register of Historic Places in 2013 for having local significance in education. They were nominated as examples of the normal school movement, which helped shape public education in Minnesota.  Winona Normal School was Minnesota's first teacher training school and first laboratory school, and operated from 1860 to 1971.

Name changes

 First State Normal School of Minnesota (1858)
 Winona Normal School (1873)
 Winona State Teachers' College (1921)
 Winona State College (1957)
 Winona State University (1975)

Academics

Winona State University offers 65 undergraduate programs and 12 graduate programs. It was one of the earliest universities in the country to offer a "Laptop University" program, now known as the e-Warrior Digital Life and Learning Program. In this program, each student, upon acceptance, is required to lease their choice of either an Apple Macintosh or Microsoft Windows-based laptop from the university. In 2013 WSU became the first public university in the Midwest to offer a tablet and a laptop to all students. The program's purpose is to increase the bond between education and technology.

Each Winona State University student pays 43 cents per credit to fund the Minnesota State University Student Association, a student-led nonprofit that advocates on behalf of all Minnesota state university students.

International education

The International Services Office is the initial contact for all international students. Winona State University provides scholarship opportunities for International Students.

Winona State University has established many sister school relations with colleges and universities around the world, including Tamkang University in Taiwan, Hebei University of Technology in Mainland China, Akita University, Tokyo International University, Toyo University in Japan, Soonchunhyang University, Chung-Ang University in South Korea, and universities in Malaysia, Mexico, Spain, Egypt, Hong Kong, Australia, etc.

Winona State Facilities

Housing
Winona State University uses 16 buildings as on-campus living communities. Nine are on the main campus, three are on West Campus, and four are east of campus.

Kirkland Hall and Haake Hall
Originally named New Hall East and New Center West, Kirkland Hall/Haake Hall opened in 2010 and consists of two adjacent buildings that are mirror images of each other. There are 106 units in this co-ed complex but each unit is single-gendered.

Prentiss-Lucas Hall
Prentiss-Lucas Hall (commonly called P-L) is one of the six freshmen residence halls. Its two sides are mirror-image duplicates of each other (Prentiss is the men's residence side and Lucas the women's), linked by a common lobby and lower level. This hall closed down after the spring semester of 2019, but reopened in fall 2020 to accommodate single-occupancy room housing in response to COVID-19.

The Quad
The Quad has four residence halls that form a square: Conway Hall, Richards Hall, Morey and Shepard Halls. The Quad contains multiple lounges, typically where the four residence halls intersect each other. It houses over 500 students, mostly freshmen. Conway Hall is a four-story building that houses all females. Morey and Shepard Halls are connected in an "L" shape. Morey-Shepard consists of men and women divided by floor. Richards Hall is a four-story residence hall. Richards is also co-ed; the first and third floor, excluding the Richards Annex, house men and the second and fourth women. Morey Hall is the oldest on campus, completed in 1911.

Sheehan Hall
Sheehan Hall was completed for Winona State College as a 14-story women-only hall in 1969. It is now co-ed, and houses most freshmen. The second through 13th floors are residential and the first is a lobby and social area with a full kitchen.

Residential College

The Residential College, also called West Campus, is on the former campus of the College of Saint Teresa, a defunct Roman Catholic women's college.

Lourdes Hall
Winona State acquired Lourdes Hall in the early 1990s. It was completed in 1928 for the College of St Teresa.

Tau Center
Tau Center was acquired in 2003 and serves as a co-educational residence hall/conference center. It is on Winona State's West Campus, behind Lourdes, and is governed in conjunction with Maria Hall. Tau was previously operated by the Diocese of Winona.

Maria Hall
Maria Hall was acquired in 2000 and serves as a co-educational, and typically freshman, residence hall, with the first and third floor as female floors, and second and fourth as male floors. Each floor has a full lounge and kitchen, complete with television, furniture, stove, refrigerator, microwave, and toaster. The basement has two large lounges, a kitchen, and a laundry room. Maria Hall is home to just over 200 students. A tunnel connects Maria to Lourdes Hall.

East Lake Apartments
East Lake was built in 2002-03 and opened in 2004, and serves as an apartment complex for both men and women. East Lake typically houses upperclassmen. Students living in East Lake do not need to purchase a meal plan, but can instead choose to get a "Block meal" plan.

Academic and sporting

KQAL, Winona State's radio station
Krueger Library
Maxwell Field at Warrior Stadium, home of Winona State Warriors football and soccer
Residence Halls at Winona State University
Kryzsko Commons, the primary student center on campus
WSU's Performing Arts Center, home to the theatre arts and dance department and the music department; site of the Great River Shakespeare Festival
The Integrated Wellness Complex aligns counseling, health, academics, intramurals, fitness and athletics into a single facility.
Warrior Hub, home of WSU academic services, including financial aid, registrar, advising, career and account services

Athletics

Winona State University competes in Division II NCAA athletics and its teams are called the Warriors. It is a member of the Northern Sun Intercollegiate Conference for most sports, except women's gymnastics (Wisconsin Intercollegiate Athletic Conference).

The school's first national championship came in 1985 when the gymnastics team took the National Association of Intercollegiate Athletics (NAIA) title, claiming four individual champions and 11 All-American honors, along with National Coach and Gymnast of the Year. The same year, the Warrior gymnastics team competed in the NCAA Division II nationals in Springfield, Massachusetts, taking home the third-place trophy, the first Winona State team to compete in both affiliations at the national level. The Warriors claimed the NAIA national title again in 1987, this time paced by one individual champion and seven All-American honors. Two gymnasts were named Academic All-Americans for their outstanding academic achievements, and the National Coach of the Year award went to WSU's head coach.

In the three following years, the gymnasts finished strong in the NCAA II regional competitions and sent individuals to the Division II nationals in 1986 (2) and 1987 (1). In 1989, the team represented the school at the Division II nationals in California after a record-breaking season.

The WSU football team won the NSIC conference championship ten times in 15 years (1993–2007). The Warriors have also appeared in postseason playoffs five times. During the 1993 season they appeared in the NAIA I playoffs and they appeared in the NCAA II playoffs in 2001, 2003, 2004, 2006, and 2017. They also participated in the Mineral Water Bowl in 2000, 2002, and 2012.

The men's basketball team won the 2006 NCAA Men's Division II Basketball Championship, the university's first NCAA title. On March 7, 2007, the men's basketball team won its 53rd consecutive regular or postseason victory, beating the Division II mark set by Langston University. The streak ended at 57 on March 24, 2007, with a 77-75 loss at the Division II Championship game to the Barton College Bulldogs on a last-second shot. On March 29, 2008, the men's basketball team defeated Augusta State University 87-76 to win its second NCAA Division II National Championship in three years.

Winona State's softball team appeared in one Women's College World Series in 1974.

Winona State's baseball team played for a national championship on June 4, 2011, facing West Florida in Cary, N.C., in the final of the NCAA Division II World Series, and finishing second.

The women's 2012 cross-country team qualified for the NCAA DII National Cross-Country Championship, placing 9th overall. Two runners earned All-American status and set the new school record with a time of 21:11 in the 6K race.

Notable alumni
 Ali al-Ahmed, Saudi scholar, founder of Institute for Gulf Affairs
 Austin Aries, professional wrestler
 J.D. Barnett, basketball coach
 Karla Bigham, state senator
 John Blatnik, member of U.S. Congress
 Josh Braaten, actor
 Logan Clark, wrestler
 Kyle and Lane Carlson, models
Gregory Davids, member of the Minnesota House of Representatives
 Dick Day, state senator
 Austin W. Lord, dean of the School of Architecture at Columbia University, 1912–15
 Troy Merritt, 2009 PGA Tour Q-School medalist
 Gene Pelowski, member of the Minnesota House of Representatives
 Tim Penny, member of U.S. Congress
 Jeanne Poppe, member of the Minnesota House of Representatives
 Jake Runestad, composer and conductor
 Jerry Seeman, NFL official
 Verner Suomi, father of satellite meteorology
 Brian Wrobel, NFL quarterback

See also

 List of colleges and universities in Minnesota
 National Register of Historic Places listings in Winona County, Minnesota

Notes

References

External links

Winona State University Athletics website

 
1858 establishments in Minnesota
Buildings and structures in Winona, Minnesota
Education in Winona County, Minnesota
Educational institutions established in 1858
National Register of Historic Places in Winona County, Minnesota
Tourist attractions in Winona County, Minnesota
University and college buildings on the National Register of Historic Places in Minnesota
Public universities and colleges in Minnesota